A turbo, or turbocharger, is a turbine-driven air induction device.

Turbo may also refer to:

Arts, entertainment and media

Fictional characters
 Turbo (comics), a superheroine in the Marvel Comics universe
 Turbo (Gobots), a fictional character in the Gobots cartoon and toy line
 Turbo, a film character in Breakin' and Breakin' 2: Electric Boogaloo
 Turbo, a character in Disney's Wreck-It Ralph
 Turbo Norimaki, a fictional character from the anime and manga series Dr. Slump

Film and television
 Turbo (film), a film by DreamWorks Animation
 Turbo: A Power Rangers Movie
 Power Rangers Turbo, television series

Gaming
 Turbo (video game), a Sega arcade game released in 1981
 TurboGrafx-16, a video game console by NEC Corporation

Music

Albums and EPs
 Turbo (Judas Priest album)
 Turbo (The Pietasters album)
 Turbo (EP), an EP by Sonic Boom Six

Groups
 Turbo (Czech band) is a Czech band founded in 1981
 Turbo (Polish band), a Polish heavy metal band
 Turbo (South Korean band), a Korean dance group

Radio
 SiriusXM Turbo, a 90s and 2000s Hard Rock music channel on SiriusXM

Science and technology
 Turbo (gastropod), a genus of sea snails

Computing
 AMD Turbo Core, a technology implemented by AMD that allows the processor to dynamically adjust its operating frequency
 Intel Turbo Boost, Intel's trade name for a feature that automatically raises its processors' operating frequency
 Turbo (software), an application virtualization and distribution environment for Microsoft Windows
 Turbo button, on computers to select one of two run states: normal speed or a "turbo" speed
 Turbo code, a form of error-correction coding, usually used in telecommunications

People
 Marcius Turbo, 2nd century Roman general
 Turbo B (Durron Maurice Butler, born 1967), American rapper and musician
 Turbo (record producer), American record producer and songwriter
 Turbo (street dancer), British street dancer, musician and entertainer

Other uses
 Turbo, Colombia, a port city
 Turbo, Eldoret, a settlement in Uasin Gishu County, Kenya
 Turbo (train), an 1960s high-speed train in Canada
 Turbo (chewing gum), a brand of Turkish chewing gum
 Turbo (finance), financial instrument
 Turbo, a mascot of the Houston Rockets basketball team

See also
 Turbo C, an integrated development environment for the C programming language
 Turbo C++, an integrated development environment for the C programming language
 Turbo Pascal, an integrated development environment for the Pascal programming language
 Turbo Tango, "aerosol" packaging for Tango
 Porsche 911 Turbo, a series of cars
 Shell Turbo Chargers a basketball team in the Philippine Basketball Association from 2000—2005
 Turbot (a homophone), a type of fish